Carla Rust (15 September 1908 – 27 December 1977) was a German film actress. She appeared as a leading lady in a number of films during the Nazi era. She was married to the actor Sepp Rist.

Selected filmography
 Don't Lose Heart, Suzanne! (1935)
 The Accusing Song (1936)
 Madame Bovary (1937)
 Mrs. Sylvelin (1938)
 Revolutionshochzeit (1938)
 The Stars Shine (1938)
 Love Letters from Engadin (1938)
 Marionette (1939)
 Robert and Bertram (1939)
 Sein Sohn (1942)
 Weiße Wäsche (1942)
 Heaven, We Inherit a Castle (1943)
 Ein fröhliches Haus (1944)
 The Beautiful Miller (1954)
 Doctor Solm (1955)
 Johannisnacht (1956)
 My Husband's Getting Married Today (1956)

Bibliography
 O'Brien, Mary-Elizabeth. Nazi Cinema as Enchantment: The Politics of Entertainment in the Third Reich. Camden House, 2006.

External links

1908 births
1977 deaths
German film actresses
Actors from Bremen
20th-century German actresses